Sandip Roy may refer to:

 Sandip Roy (cricketer) (born 1989), Bangladeshi cricketer

See also
 Sandip Ray (born 1953), Indian film director and music director